St Mary's Hospital is  a health facility on London Road in Kettering, Northamptonshire, England. It is managed by Northamptonshire Healthcare NHS Foundation Trust.  It was opened in 1838.

History
The facility,  which was designed  by Sir George Gilbert Scott,  opened as the Kettering Union Workhouse in 1838. An infirmary was added to the east of the main building in the mid-1890s. It became St Helen's Hospital in 1935 and joined the National Health Service as St Mary's Hospital in 1948. The height was reduced to one storey throughout in 1971. The Welland Centre,  a mental health unit which was  procured under a Private Finance Initiative contract, opened in 2005.

References

External links
Official site

Hospitals established in 1838
1838 establishments in England
Hospitals in Northamptonshire
NHS hospitals in England